Baylor International Academy is a school established in 1997 in the center of Banepa, Nepal. The school has its own land and buildings of about 2,000 square feet (190 m2). It runs from Grade nursery to Grade 12.

Schools in Nepal
Education in Kavrepalanchok District
1997 establishments in Nepal